The Jyothy Institute of Technology (JIT) is a private engineering college in Bangalore, Karnataka, India, affiliated to the Visvesvaraya Technological University, Belgaum and approved by AICTE - New Delhi. It was founded by Dr. B N V Subramanya, Karnataka Rajyotsva awardee, and is managed by the Jyothy Charitable Trust. Jyothy Institute of Technology is in Tataguni, off Kanakapura road, Bengaluru, Karnataka, a little distance before Art of Living. The college offers a Bachelor of Engineering degree in five disciplines

References

Private engineering colleges in India
Engineering colleges in Bangalore
Educational institutions established in 2011
2011 establishments in India